Snakewood is a common name of several different plants:

 Acacia species (family Fabaceae) in Australia, Acacia eremaea, Acacia intorta, Acacia xiphophylla
 Brosimum guianense (= Piratinera guianensis) (family Moraceae) (Letterwood, Leopardwood) in South America, an exotic hardwood prized for its highly figured grain
 Cecropia species, from North South America to Middle America, Cecropia peltata, Cecropia palmata and others 
 Colubrina species (family Rhamnaceae) in North America
 Condalia species (family Rhamnaceae) in North and South America
 Mennegoxylon species, an extinct genus of trees
 Strychnos colubrina, from Myanmar, Sulawesi, New Guinea
 Zygia species, such as Zygia racemosa

See also
Serpentwood

References